is a Japanese actress, sister of actress Mikako Ichikawa. She began in 1991 as a model, and released a single in 1998 and an album the following year. She debuted in acting in 2000 and starred in the films Another Heaven in 2000 and Konsento (aka Concent or Power Point) in 2001. But after that, she received minor roles in films All About Lily Chou-Chou, Karaoke Terror, Princess Raccoon, and in TV dramas, including Mike Hama or Anego with Ryoko Shinohara. She was given one of the main roles 2008 film Nightmare Detective 2.

Discography

Singles
  (1998)

Albums
 Pin-up Girl (1999)

Filmography

Movies 
 Another Heaven (2000)
 Konsento (aka Consent / Power Point) (2001)
 All About Lily Chou-Chou (2001)
 Showa Kayo Daizenshu (2003)
 Kiss to Kizu (2004)
 Tanaka Hiroshi no Subete (2005)
 Mirrored Mind (2005)
 In the Pool (2005)
 Princess Raccoon (2005)
 Into a Dream (2005)
 Notebook of Life (2005)
 Kiraware Matsuko no Issho (2006)
 Sex Is No Laughing Matter (2007)
 Nightmare Detective 2 (Akumu Tantei 2) (2008) 
 It All Began When I Met You (2013)
 Around the Table (2021)
 Will I Be Single Forever? (2021), Yukino
 Just Remembering (2022), Makita
 Haw (2022)
 Call Me Chihiro (2023), the other Chihiro

Dramas 
 Shiritsu Tantei Hama Mike (NTV, 2002)
 Kogen e Irasshai (TBS, 2003)
 Good Luck!! (TBS, 2003)
 Shin Yonigeya Honpo (NTV, 2003, ep2)
 Roomshare no Onna (NHK, 2005)
 Anego (NTV, 2005)
 Kami wa Saikoro o Furanai (NTV, 2006)
 Kaette Kita Jikou Keisatsu (TV Asahi, 2007, ep2)
 Sexy Voice and Robo (NTV, 2007, ep4)
 Watashitachi no Kyokasho (Fuji TV, 2007, ep7-8)
 Judge (NHK, 2007)
 Average 2 (Fuji TV, 2008)
 Judge II (NHK, 2008)
 Triangle (Fuji TV, 2009, ep1-3)

References

External links 
 

Japanese actresses
1976 births
Living people
Japanese female models
Singers from Tokyo
21st-century Japanese singers